Katrin Johansson is a singer/songwriter from Helsinki, Finland whose songs are indiepop, dreampop, urban pop genre. Artist released her first single 'One Last Kiss' in November 2014, and according to the known music blog she has a soft voice and true pop songsAccording to the Great American Song Contest, Katrin Johansson is one of the 20 best singers/songwriters in 2014.  Katrin is a public figure in Finland, who carries out a social art project Lonely Together, which aims to promote intercultural competence through her music.
The idea of the project to show, how people with different backgrounds react on the same song, and participants tell their feelings about music and how it can make the World a better place. 
Artist is nominated for the Golden Women Awards 2015 in the Entertainment category
Forth single Free Your Mind was released 18. July 2017, and has hit Dutch Dance Top40

References

Year of birth missing (living people)
Living people
Finnish women singer-songwriters